Sergei Vladimirovich Andronov (born 19 July 1989) is a Russian professional ice hockey player for Lokomotiv Yaroslavl of the Kontinental Hockey League. He previously played in the KHL with Lada Togliatti and CSKA Moscow.

Playing career
He was drafted by the St. Louis Blues in the third round (#78 overall) of the 2009 NHL draft  On 28 August 2012, Andronov came to North America and signed a one-year AHL contract with the Peoria Rivermen, affiliate of the St. Louis Blues.  On 24 March 2013, he signed a two-year deal with the Blues.

As a restricted free agent at the expiration of his contract with the Blues, Andronov opted to return to his former club, HC CSKA Moscow of the KHL, on 4 August 2014.

Following 11 seasons with CSKA, captaining the club to the Gagarin Cup on two occasions, Andronov left the club and signed as a free agent to a two-year contract with Lokomotiv Yaroslavl on 24 May 2022.

International play
Andronov has played for Russia in the World Junior Championships and the World Championships. He served as an assistant captain on the Olympic Athletes from Russia team that won the gold medal at the 2018 Winter Olympics.

On 23 January 2022, Andronov was named to the roster to represent Russian Olympic Committee athletes at the 2022 Winter Olympics.

Career statistics

Regular season and playoffs

International

Awards and honors

References

External links

1989 births
Living people
Chicago Wolves players
HC CSKA Moscow players
HC Lada Togliatti players
Sportspeople from Penza
Ice hockey players at the 2018 Winter Olympics
Ice hockey players at the 2022 Winter Olympics
Olympic ice hockey players of Russia
Medalists at the 2018 Winter Olympics
Medalists at the 2022 Winter Olympics
Olympic medalists in ice hockey
Olympic gold medalists for Olympic Athletes from Russia
Olympic silver medalists for the Russian Olympic Committee athletes
Peoria Rivermen (AHL) players
Russian expatriate sportspeople in the United States
Russian expatriate ice hockey people
Russian ice hockey right wingers
St. Louis Blues draft picks